CCK may refer to:

Computing
 Complementary code keying, a modulation technique used in IEEE 802.11b
 Composite candidate key, a candidate key comprising more than one field 
 Client Customization Kit, a set of tools to aid in distributing customized Mozilla clients, see list of Mozilla products

Government agencies
 Communications Commission of Kenya
 Constitutional Court of Korea

Medicine
 Cholecystokinin, a digestive hormone

People
 Chiang Ching-kuo, Taiwanese president
 Chris Kanyon, American wrestler

Places
 Ching Chuan Kang Air Base, Taiwan
 Choa Chu Kang, Singapore
 Cocos Islands (by ISO 3166-1 country code)

Transport
 Choa Chu Kang MRT/LRT station, Singapore (by station abbreviation)
 Cocos (Keeling) Islands Airport (by IATA code)

Other
 Chama Cha Kijamii, a political party in Tanzania
 Candy Coated Killahz a Canadian hip-hop/electronic music group.
 Néstor Kirchner Cultural Centre, "Centro Cultural Kirchner" in Spanish language, institution in Argentina